Father and Guns 2 is a Canadian comedy film originating from Quebec, directed by Émile Gaudreault and released in 2017. A sequel to the 2009 film Father and Guns (De père en flic), the film reunites Michel Côté and Louis-José Houde as feuding father and son police officers Jacques and Marc Laroche, placing them in an undercover assignment at a couples therapy camp.

The film's cast also includes Karine Vanasse, Patrice Robitaille, Julie Le Breton, Sonia Vachon, Yves Jacques and Alexandre Landry.

Awards
The film was named the winner of the Golden Screen Award as the highest-grossing Canadian film of the year, at the 6th Canadian Screen Awards.

References

External links
 

2017 films
2010s French-language films
Canadian comedy films
Films directed by Émile Gaudreault
Canadian sequel films
2017 comedy films
French-language Canadian films
2010s Canadian films